The West Loch Lomond Cycle Path is a cycle path that runs from Arrochar and Tarbet railway station, at the upper end of Loch Lomond in Scotland, to Balloch railway station, at the bottom of the loch.  It was officially opened on 20 June 2006 by Tavish Scott.

The route 
From Arrochar & Tarbet Station  the path runs left and down a hill to a tourist information office by the loch. The path then continues on the pavement of the A82 for several miles. For the remainder of its length the path runs either alongside the road, or between the road and the loch.

Much of the path runs directly alongside the A82, and the rest is not very far away. The golf courses and commercial developments along the side of the loch further push parts of the path away from the banks of Loch Lomond.

Access to the path 
There are railway stations at each end of the West Loch Lomond Cycle Path, but none along its length. The Oban/Mallaig railway service runs from Glasgow Queen Street station to Arrochar & Tarbet station. The train goes up the shores of Gare Loch; passing Faslane Naval Base (aka HMS Neptune), the home of the United Kingdom's fleet of Trident nuclear submarines. Trains from Balloch connect to Glasgow's Central and Queen Street stations.

Photographs

References

External links 

Downloadable PDF leaflet from Loch Lomond and the Trossachs National Park
Annotated map of the West Loch Lomond Cycle Path and the Loch Lomond to Glasgow Cycleway.

Cycleways in Scotland
Loch Lomond